Anjara is an ancient town located at northern Jordan in the Ajloun Governorate. The city is situated 4 kilometers to the south of Ajloun, and 73 kilometers to the north of the Jordanian capital Amman.

Etymology 
The name of Anjara is composed of two words: Ain (spring well in Arabic) + Jara meaning running. The full name would mean the "running spring".

History
In biblical legend, Anjara has its assertions where Jesus and His Mother Mary passed through here and lived in a cave during their journey to the ten cities of Decapolis.

It had a population of 27 Muslim households and 4 Muslim bachelors, in addition to 13 Christian households and 1 Christian bachelor. They paid a fixed tax-rate of 25%  on various  agricultural products, including wheat, barley, olive trees, goats and beehives, in addition to  occasional revenues; a total of  10,000 akçe. 

In 1838 'Anjara's inhabitants were predominantly Sunni Muslims and Greek Christians.

The Jordanian census of 1961 found 3,163 inhabitants in 'Anjara, of whom 719 were Christians.

Landmarks
 Our Lady of the Mount, Anjara, Jordan, a Catholic pilgrim site in the Middle East.

Notable people
 Saba Mubarak (born 1976), Jordanian actress and producer

 Lewis Mukattash (1943-2011), Jordanian linguist, scholar and academic. Professor of English Linguistics.

References

Bibliography

External Links
Photos of Anjara at the American Center of Research

Populated places in Ajloun Governorate